Nearing may refer to:
 Daniel Nearing (born 1961), U.S. screenwriter
 Helen Nearing (1904-1995), U.S. simple living advocate, wife of Scott Nearing
 Homer Nearing (1915-2004), U.S. professor and author
 Scott Nearing (1883-1983), U.S. simple living advocate, husband of Helen Nearing
 Vivienne Nearing (1926-2007), U.S. game show winner on Twenty One

See also 
 Near (disambiguation)
 John Scott (writer), a member of the family of Scott and Helen Nearing